Mickey de Boer is a Dutch former cricketer who played as a right-handed batter and right-arm off break bowler.  She appeared in one One Day International for the Netherlands, against New Zealand at Haarlem on 8 August 1984, scoring 8* and taking 1 for 40 in 11 overs. She played domestic cricket for Kent.

References

External links
 
 

Living people
Date of birth missing (living people)
Year of birth missing (living people)
Place of birth missing (living people)
Dutch women cricketers
Netherlands women One Day International cricketers
Kent women cricketers